Terrance Arthur Crisp (born May 28, 1943) is a Canadian former professional ice hockey coach and player. Crisp played ten seasons in the National Hockey League for the Boston Bruins, St. Louis Blues, New York Islanders and Philadelphia Flyers between 1965 and 1977. Crisp coached for 11 seasons in the National Hockey League for the Philadelphia Flyers, Calgary Flames and Tampa Bay Lightning. He currently is a radio and TV broadcaster for the Nashville Predators.  On October 30, 2021, the Predators announced Crisp will be retiring from his broadcast duties at the end of the 2021-22 season.

Crisp was a member of two Stanley Cup championship teams with the Philadelphia Flyers in the 1970s, and later coached the Calgary Flames to the title in 1989.

Playing career
Crisp got his start playing Jr. 'B' hockey with the St. Marys Lincolns of the Western Jr. 'B' Hockey League. In 1961 he edged out Phil Esposito of the Sarnia Legionnaires for the league scoring title. At 17, he had pondered quitting hockey due to homesickness and become a school teacher. However, Stan Moore, who coached the B team, followed him when Crisp travelled four hours to his home at Parry Sound. He convinced him to pack his suitcase and come back down to play.

Crisp began his pro career in the Boston Bruins organization, playing one season for them before being chosen by the St. Louis Blues in the 1967 NHL expansion draft.  With the Blues, he went to the finals three straight seasons.  In 1972, he was again chosen in the expansion draft, this time by the New York Islanders.  Late in the 1972–73 season, he was traded to the Philadelphia Flyers for Jean Potvin.  It is believed the trade was made because the Islanders, who would have the first overall pick in the upcoming draft, intended to draft Denis Potvin, and believed having his older brother on the team would entice him to sign with the Isles instead of going to the rival World Hockey Association.

Crisp played on the notorious Philadelphia Flyers teams of the 1970s when they were also known as the Broad Street Bullies. He won two Stanley Cups as a member of the Flyers in 1973–74 and 1974–75.

Coaching career
Crisp retired two games into the 1976-77 season at the age of 33 to become the Flyers assistant coach under Fred Shero. In the 1980s, he coached in the junior ranks and led the 1985 Sault Ste Marie Greyhounds to an undefeated season at home, going 33-0. The club finished first in the Ontario Hockey League with 54 wins, eleven losses, and one tie. The club set a Canadian junior record by winning 33 games in a row at home. The Sault also took the OHL playoff championship, losing just two games, both at home. The Greyhounds represented the OHL at the Memorial Cup, where they came up short, losing to eventual champion Prince Albert of the WHL.

Thanks to his tremendous coaching success in junior, Crisp was named head coach of the Calgary Flames in 1987-88, following two years as the head coach of the team's AHL affiliate in Moncton. The 1987–88 Calgary Flames season saw them go 48–23–9 and win their first division title in team history, which saw Crisp allow his players to decide who would play and who would not among a cadre of talent that included Al MacInnis, Theo Fleury, Joe Nieuwendyk, and Lanny McDonald. They were awarded the Presidents' Trophy due to having the most points among all NHL teams. However, the Flames lost in the second round to their rival in the Edmonton Oilers, who beat them in a sweep in an eventual Stanley Cup championship (their fourth in five years). The 397 goals scored in the season is a franchise record. 

The 1988–89 Calgary Flames season was even better. They went 54–17–9 (becoming the fifth team to win 50 games in league history) and lost only four times at home in the regular season while winning the Presidents' Trophy again. In the playoffs, the only challenge proved to be in the first round against the Vancouver Canucks, who took them to Game 7 that saw Calgary win in overtime. They won the next two rounds while only losing once combined to reach the 1989 Stanley Cup Final. Facing the Montreal Canadiens, they won Game 1 before Montreal took the next two games. However, Crisp and the Flames rebounded with three straight wins, which included a Game 6 win at the Montreal Forum, becoming the second and last team to clinch a Stanley Cup at the historic venue. The 1989–90 Calgary Flames season saw them go 42–23–15 and win another division title while being the best in their conference. They faced the Los Angeles Kings, who had finished 24 points behind them. Calgary would be stunned in six games by the Kings, who split the first two games in Calgary before winning the next two (with a 12-4 loss being one of them). Only a Game 5 win delayed their demise in a Game 6 that saw them lose in double overtime.

On May 7, 1990, three weeks after the defeat, Crisp was fired. He had received attention in the city due to criticizing his players in public, and he was told to tone down his fiery temper behind the bench due to the complaints from fans of his foul language. He went 144-63-33 in three seasons. The Flames did not have an immediate successor for Crisp until they hired Doug Risebrough. The Flames would not win a postseason series until 2004.

Crisp was hired as the inaugural coach of the expansion team Tampa Bay Lightning on April 23, 1992. He was hired due to his "pizzazz, some jump, some color" by general manager Phil Esposito in order to help sell tickets along with coach. They lost plenty of games in the first few years (125 in the first three seasons) before the 1995–96 Tampa Bay Lightning season saw them make the postseason on the final day of the season. They had a record of 38–32–12 and made it as the 8th seed by two points. In the playoffs, they faced the Philadelphia Flyers. The Lightning won Game 2 in overtime before returning to Tampa to host their first ever playoff games. They won Game 3 in overtime, but the Flyers won the next three games to win the series. They finished 32-40-10 the following year, finishing three points out of a playoff spot. The bottom fell out the next year. They were 2-6-2 going into a matchup against the New York Rangers. They led 3-1 in the third period before the Rangers scored three straight goals to win 4-3. He was fired two days after the game on October 26. He was replaced by Rick Paterson on an interim basis for six games before Jacques Demers was brought in to coach the rest of the season, which saw them win 17 games for the second time in four seasons. He went 142–204–45 with Tampa.

Broadcasting career
For a time, Crisp served as a reporter for NHL on Fox. In 1997, Crisp was hired to serve as the color commentator for the Nashville Predators, working for Fox Sports Tennessee and its successor Bally Sports South alongside play-by-play man Pete Weber. He moved from the broadcasting booth to analyst after the 2013-2014 season. His contribution in hockey insight earned him induction into the Tennessee Sports Hall of Fame in 2020. He announced his retirement from broadcasting in October 2021, effective at the end of the 2021-22 season.

Awards
 1973–74 - Stanley Cup Champion (Philadelphia Flyers)
 1974–75 - Stanley Cup Champion (Philadelphia Flyers)
 1988–89 - Stanley Cup Champion (Calgary Flames - Head Coach)

Career statistics

Coaching record

NHL head coaching

Minor leagues & assistant coach positions

1 Midseason replacement

References

External links
 

1943 births
Living people
Boston Bruins players
Buffalo Bisons (AHL) players
Calgary Flames coaches
Canadian expatriate ice hockey players in the United States
Canadian ice hockey centres
Canadian ice hockey coaches
Canadian sports announcers
Ice hockey people from Ontario
Kansas City Blues players
Minneapolis Bruins players
Nashville Predators announcers
National Hockey League assistant coaches
National Hockey League broadcasters
New York Islanders players
Niagara Falls Flyers (1960–1972) players
Oklahoma City Blazers (1965–1977) players
Philadelphia Flyers coaches
Philadelphia Flyers players
St. Louis Blues players
Sault Ste. Marie Greyhounds coaches
Sportspeople from Parry Sound, Ontario
Stanley Cup champions
Stanley Cup championship-winning head coaches
Tampa Bay Lightning coaches